The World War I Veterans Memorial Highway may refer to:
 Wisconsin Highway 29
 U.S. Route 395 in Oregon
World War I memorials in the United States